John Blennerhassett (1769 – 6 July 1794) was an Anglo-Irish politician.

Blennerhassett was the son of William Blennerhassett and Catherine Johnson, and the great-grandson of John Blennerhassett. He was educated at Trinity College, Dublin, graduating with a master's in 1792. Between 1790 and his death in 1794 Blennerhassett sat in the Irish House of Commons as the Member of Parliament for Kerry. He was unmarried when he died.

References

1769 births
1794 deaths
Alumni of Trinity College Dublin
18th-century Anglo-Irish people
John
Irish MPs 1790–1797
People from County Kerry
Members of the Parliament of Ireland (pre-1801) for County Kerry constituencies